Bergens Skillingsbank was a Norwegian bank based in Bergen, Norway. It was established as a savings bank in 1857, but converted to a commercial bank in 1919. In 1993 it took over Norges Hypotekinstitutt. In 1997 it changed its name to Bergensbanken, the same year as the company upgraded its offices. In 1999 it was bought by Handelsbanken and amalgamated.

References

Defunct banks of Norway
Companies based in Bergen
1999 disestablishments in Norway
Banks established in 1857
Banks disestablished in 1999
Mutual savings banks in Norway
Norwegian companies established in 1857